Chantel Nicole Jones (born July 20, 1988) is a retired American professional soccer player who works as a goalkeeping coach at Canberra United in the W-League. She previously played as a goalkeeper for the professional Icelandic team, Þór Akureyri, Washington Spirit and Western New York Flash of the NWSL as well as Perth Glory and Canberra United in the Australian W-League and the Virginia Cavaliers.

College
She currently holds the NCAA record for most career shutouts, with 47 during her college career at the University of Virginia.

Club career
In 2012, Jones played for Þór Akureyri in Akureyri, Iceland. She made 18 appearances for the club, starting all games for a total of 1620 minutes. She wrote about her experience in Iceland for Resolution Sports.

In February 2013, Jones was signed to the Washington Spirit for the inaugural season of the NWSL.

In July 2014, Jones signed for Canberra United in the Australian W-League. During the Grand Final match on December 21, 2014, Jones saved a penalty kick taken by Perth Glory FC in the 76th minute, preserving Canberra United's 2–1 lead.  Canberra United FC scored again to win the championship 3–1.  Jones signed for the Western New York Flash for the 2015 season.

Jones retired from soccer in January 2016.

In January 2021, while working as Canberra United's goalkeeping coach, Jones returned from retirement to sign a playing contract with the club until the end of the 2020–21 W-League season. At the end of the season, she returned to retirement.

International career
Jones represented the United States at the 2008 FIFA U-20 Women's World Cup and also participated in the 2007 Pan American Games.

References

External links
 
 Virginia profile
 Washington Spirit player profile
 

American women's soccer players
1988 births
Living people
Virginia Cavaliers women's soccer players
Soccer players from New York (state)
People from Brookhaven, New York
Soccer players from Virginia
People from Midlothian, Virginia
Washington Spirit players
Perth Glory FC (A-League Women) players
Canberra United FC players
National Women's Soccer League players
Western New York Flash players
Women's association football goalkeepers
Lesbian sportswomen
American LGBT soccer players
Pan American Games silver medalists for the United States
United States women's under-20 international soccer players
Pan American Games medalists in football
Chantel Jones
LGBT people from Virginia
Footballers at the 2007 Pan American Games
American expatriate women's soccer players
American expatriate sportspeople in Iceland
Expatriate women's footballers in Iceland
American expatriate sportspeople in Australia
Expatriate women's soccer players in Australia
USL W-League (1995–2015) players
Medalists at the 2007 Pan American Games
21st-century LGBT people